The Prussian G 7.3 was a class of 2-8-0 locomotives of the Prussian state railways. The third class of the G 7 series, they were intended to power heavy goods trains on steep inclines, on which the permissible axle load was not yet that high. This affected for example, the Paderborn–Holzminden and Betzdorf–Siegen routes.

A larger boiler could be used due to the front carrying axle. Like the G 7.2, the G 7.3 was designed as a compound locomotive. A total of only fifteen of these locomotives were built between 1893 and 1895, all of them by Hanomag; this was due to and increase in the permissible axle loads meant that the cheaper G 7.1s, without a front carrying axle, could also travel on these routes. In World War I this type was remembered because there was a need for simple locomotives with a low axle load, and production was resumed. Another 70 locomotives were built by J. A. Maffei, Krauss and Maschinenfabrik Esslingen. They were delivered directly to the German Army railways (Heeresbahnen).

After World War I several locomotives had to be surrendered to foreign railways. The Polish State Railways (PKP) operated 23 locomotives under the class designation Tr1.

The Grand Duchy of Mecklenburg Friedrich-Franz Railway (MFFE) bought five G 7.3 locomotives second-hand,  and the Lübeck-Büchen Railway Company (LBE) bought four G 7.3s, also second-hand. In 1925, the Deutsche Reichsbahn included eleven locomotives in their  renumbering plan. The G 7.3s from Prussia were renumbered 55 701 and 56 001 to 56 005, those from the MFFE, 56 201 to 56 205. After the nationalisation of the LBE in 1938, its two remaining locomotives were renumbered as (second) 56 001 and 56 002.

References 

 
 
 
 
 
 
 
 
 
 

2-8-0 locomotives
1′D n2v locomotives
G 07.3
Standard gauge locomotives of Germany
Railway locomotives introduced in 1893
Hanomag locomotives
Maffei locomotives
Krauss locomotives
Esslingen locomotives
Freight locomotives